The Volvo ECC (Environmental Concept Car) was an executive luxury concept car built by Volvo in 1992. It was a design exercise in using recycled material and hybrid technology. It was powered by a hybrid electric and gas turbine engine. Many of its lines and general styling were used as inspiration for the first generation Volvo S80. The ECC set a new design language for future Volvo models from the S80 onwards, the most obvious styling feature being the stepped waistline, which was inspired by the similar feature on the 200 Series, whilst retaining some of the angular elements from the 700/900 ranges.

The Volvo ECC was built on the Volvo P80 platform. In contrast to most production hybrids, which use a gasoline piston engine to provide additional acceleration and to recharge the battery storage, the Volvo ECC used a gas turbine engine to drive the generator for recharging. This type of engine has a higher thermodynamic efficiency than the conventional internal combustion engine with pistons. Also in Volvo's design, the fuel is evaporated and mixed with air before ignition. This provides a very low NOx emission. The driver can also switch between gas turbine electric and hybrid by switches on the dashboard.

It had a drag coefficient of 0.23. With the vehicle weighing approximately  more than a conventional Volvo 850, acceleration from 0-60 mph (97 km/h) took 23 seconds in EV mode and 12.5 seconds with the turbine engaged.

The Volvo ECC was debuted at a time when California was seeking Zero Pollution Vehicles (ZPV). With its gas turbine, the Volvo ECC was not a zero-emissions vehicle, and hence did not meet the needs of the time. With the focus now shifted away from true zero-emissions vehicles, many of the concepts tested in the ECC may prove of value in future concept and production vehicles.

References

External links
Trafikmagasinet visar Volvo ECC
Om Volvo ECC på Volvocars.com
Volvo Hybrid Environmental Concept Car

Volvo C30 ReCharge Concept 
Om Volvo ReCharge Concept diesel på Volvocars Newsroom
Om Volvo ReCharge Concept flexifuel på Volvocars Newsroom

ECC
Cars powered by gas turbines
Partial zero-emissions vehicles
Front-wheel-drive vehicles
Hybrid electric cars